Ángel David Perdomo (born May 7, 1994) is a Dominican professional baseball pitcher in the Pittsburgh Pirates organization. He previously played in Major League Baseball (MLB) for the Milwaukee Brewers.

Career

Toronto Blue Jays
Perdomo signed with the Blue Jays as an international free agent on November 28, 2011. He was assigned to the Dominican Summer League Blue Jays for the 2012 season, where he pitched to a 5.40 earned run average (ERA), 13 strikeouts, and 13 walks in seven games totaling 11 innings. He remained with the DSL Blue Jays in 2013, pitching 26 innings and posting a 0–1 win–loss record, 3.04 ERA, and 43 strikeouts. Perdomo was promoted to the Rookie-level Gulf Coast Blue Jays in 2014, and appeared in 13 games. He would compile a 3–2 record, 2.54 ERA, and 57 strikeouts in 46 innings.

Perdomo began the 2015 minor league season with the Rookie-Advanced Bluefield Blue Jays, and later earned a promotion to the Short Season-A Vancouver Canadians. He pitched a combined 69 innings in 2015, and posted a 6–1 record, 2.60 ERA, and 67 strikeouts. Continuing to progress through the Blue Jays minor league system, Perdomo was assigned to the Class-A Lansing Lugnuts to open the 2016 season. In June he was selected to play in the All-Star Futures Game as an injury replacement for Dylan Unsworth. Perdomo made 25 starts and two relief appearances for the Lugnuts in 2016, and posted a 5–7 record, 3.19 ERA, and 156 strikeouts in 127 innings. He played the entire 2017 season with the Advanced-A Dunedin Blue Jays, and went 5–6 with a 3.70 ERA and 65 strikeouts in 75 innings. Perdomo stayed with Dunedin in 2018, pitching to a 1–5 record, 3.63 ERA, and 100 strikeouts in 79 innings. He elected free agency on November 2, 2018.

Milwaukee Brewers
Perdomo signed a minor league contract with the Milwaukee Brewers on November 12, 2018. He split the 2019 season between the Biloxi Shuckers and San Antonio Missions, going a combined 5–2 with a 4.28 ERA over  innings. Perdomo was added to the Brewers 40–man roster on November 2, 2019.

On July 6, 2020, it was announced that Perdomo had tested positive for COVID-19. On August 13, 2020, Perdomo was called up to the active roster. On August 18, he made his MLB debut against the Minnesota Twins.

On August 11, 2021, Perdomo was placed on the injured list with a lower back strain, and was later transferred to the 60-day injured list on September 1.

Tampa Bay Rays
On July 19, 2022, Perdomo was claimed off waivers by the Tampa Bay Rays. He was designated for assignment on July 30, 2022. He elected free agency on November 10, 2022.

Pittsburgh Pirates
On December 22, 2022, Perdomo signed a minor league deal with the Pittsburgh Pirates.

References

External links

1994 births
Living people
Biloxi Shuckers players
Bluefield Blue Jays players
Dominican Republic expatriate baseball players in Canada
Dominican Republic expatriate baseball players in the United States
Dominican Summer League Blue Jays players
Dunedin Blue Jays players
Gulf Coast Blue Jays players
Lansing Lugnuts players
Major League Baseball players from the Dominican Republic
Major League Baseball pitchers
Milwaukee Brewers players
Nashville Sounds players
People from San Cristóbal, Dominican Republic
San Antonio Missions players
Toros del Este players
Vancouver Canadians players